Kivlenieks (feminine: Kivleniece) is a Latvian toponymic surname. Individuals with the surname include:

 Inārs Kivlenieks (born 1986), Latvian luger
 Matīss Kivlenieks (1996–2021), Latvian ice hockey goaltender

Latvian-language masculine surnames